Federal elections were held in West Germany on 6 September 1953 to elect the members of the second Bundestag. The Christian Democratic Union (CDU) emerged as the largest party.

This elections were the last before Saarland joined West Germany in 1957. It had been a separate entity, Saar protectorate, under French control since 1946.

Campaign
Federal Chancellor Konrad Adenauer (who was also CDU leader) campaigned on his policies of economic reconstruction and growth, moderate conservatism or Christian democracy, and close relations with the United States. During the campaign he attacked the Social Democratic Party (SPD) ferociously. His staff had a comfortable coach on a train previously used only by Hermann Göring and behind that a dining car with sleeping berths for journalists. The new SPD leader (Kurt Schumacher had died in 1952) was Erich Ollenhauer, who was more moderate in his policies than Schumacher had been. He did not oppose, in principle, the United States' military presence in Western Europe. He later – in 1957 – supported a military alliance of most European countries, including Germany. On 3 September American Secretary of State John Foster Dulles said that "A defeat for Adenauer would have catastrophic consequences for the prospects for German reunification and the restoration of sovereignty" and that it would "trigger off such confusion in Germany that further delays in German efforts for reunification and freedom would be unavoidable." Adenauer managed to convince clearly more West German voters of his leadership abilities and economic and political success to easily win a second term, although he had to form a coalition government with the Free Democratic Party and the conservative German Party to gain a majority in the Bundestag.

Results

Results by state

Constituency seats

List seats

Aftermath 
Konrad Adenauer remained Chancellor, governing in a broad coalition (two-thirds majority) with most of the minor parties except for the SPD and Centre Party.

Notes

References

Federal elections in Germany
1953 elections in Germany
Konrad Adenauer
1953 in West Germany
September 1953 events in Europe